WFBM may refer to:

 WFBM (FM), a radio station (90.5 FM) licensed to serve Beaver Springs, Pennsylvania, United States
 WNDE, an AM radio station (1260 kHz) licensed to serve Indianapolis, Indiana, United States, which held the call sign WFBM from 1924 to 1973
 WFBQ, an FM radio station (94.7 MHz) licensed to serve Indianapolis, Indiana, which held the call sign WFBM-FM from 1955 to 1973
 WRTV, a television station (channel 6 analog/25 digital) licensed to serve Indianapolis, Indiana, which held the call sign WFBM-TV from 1949 to 1972
 WYIC, an AM radio station (1110 kHz) licensed to serve Noblesville, Indiana, which held the call sign WFBM from 1979 to 1987
 WFBM-LP, a defunct low-power radio station (100.1 MHz) formerly licensed to serve Beaver Springs, Pennsylvania